Dømkirke is a live album by Sunn O))) that was recorded at Bergen Cathedral in Bergen, Norway, during the Borealis Festival. The album was pressed only on vinyl, but it was later made available in digital-download and streaming formats. It is a double album that features one track on each side of the records. The packaging of Dømkirke features artwork by the Norwegian visual artist Tania Stene.

Track listing

The D-side is etched with "Fantoft, Fantoft, don't you wanna?"

Pressings
All pressings are on 180g vinyl.
Baby blue marble vinyl (Exclusive to Europe. Limited to 1000)
Clear vinyl with black swirls (Mail order only. Limited to 900 copies)
Red vinyl (Hot Topic Exclusive. Limited to 600 copies)
Black vinyl
2nd Press: all on grey vinyl

Personnel
Stephen O'Malley
Greg Anderson
Attila Csihar
Steve Moore
Lasse Marhaug
T.O.S

References

Sunn O))) albums
2008 live albums
Southern Lord Records albums